The magistrate of Yilan County is the chief executive of the government of Yilan County. This list includes directly elected magistrates of the county. The incumbent Magistrate is Lin Zi-miao of Kuomintang since 25 December 2018.

Directly elected County Magistrates

Timeline

See also
 Yilan County Government

References

External links 
 Magistrate - Yilan County Government 
 

 
Yilan County